Lloyd Cole (born 31 January 1961) is an English singer and songwriter.  He was lead vocalist of Lloyd Cole and the Commotions from 1984 to 1989 and subsequently worked solo.

Early life
Cole was born in Buxton, Derbyshire, England. He grew up in nearby Chapel-en-le-Frith and went to New Mills Grammar School and later attended Runshaw College in Leyland, Lancashire. He studied a year of law at University College London but switched to the University of Glasgow, where he studied philosophy and English, and also met the future members of the Commotions.

Career

1984–1989: Lloyd Cole and the Commotions
The Commotions' 1984 debut studio album, Rattlesnakes, contained literary and pop culture references to such figures as Arthur Lee, Norman Mailer, Grace Kelly, Eva Marie Saint, Simone de Beauvoir, Truman Capote and Joan Didion. The group produced two more albums, Easy Pieces and Mainstream, before disbanding in 1989. 

Songs by the band include "Perfect Skin", "Rattlesnakes", "Forest Fire", "Are You Ready to Be Heartbroken?", "Lost Weekend" and "Jennifer She Said". Cole subsequently relocated to New York City and recorded with various musicians, including Fred Maher, Robert Quine and Matthew Sweet.

1990–1992: Lloyd Cole and Don't Get Weird on Me Babe
This solo setting produced two studio albums, Lloyd Cole in 1990 – preceded by the single "No Blue Skies" – and Don't Get Weird on Me Babe in 1991. The latter was recorded in two parts: one side continued the New York rock of his debut solo studio album, while the other side featured a session orchestra, much in the style of Burt Bacharach or Scott Walker.  While he remained with Polydor as his record label, the US distribution contract with Capitol Records ended. (US rights were picked up by Rykodisc.) "She's a Girl and I'm a Man" was released as a single.  

"Downtown" (from Lloyd Cole, 1990) was featured in the film Bad Influence (1990) – starring Rob Lowe and James Spader – while "Pay for It" (from Don't Get Weird on Me Babe, 1991) was on the soundtrack of When the Party's Over, starring Sandra Bullock.

1993–1999: Bad Vibes, Love Story and The Collection

Cole recorded Bad Vibes in 1993, a collaboration with producer/remixer Adam Peters, using a harder sound. "So You'd Like to Save the World" and "Morning Is Broken" were released as singles. 

Love Story (1995) was recorded with the help of Stephen Street (who has worked with Blur and the Smiths) and former Commotion Neil Clark. It produced a minor hit with the song "Like Lovers Do", affording Cole a mid-1990s appearance on Top of the Pops. However, following  Universal Music's takeover of PolyGram, his recording contract was terminated, despite at least two studio recordings being locked in its vaults (later released in 2002 by One Little Indian). Love Story was a Top 30 hit in the UK. 

In 1998 Cole's song "Margo's Waltz" (from 1991's Don't Get Weird on Me Babe album) was featured in the film There's Something About Mary.

In the same year The Collection was released, featuring eight songs with the Commotions and twelve solo singles. The album peaked at #24 on the UK album charts.

2000–2009: The Negatives, Music in a Foreign Language and Antidepressant
In 1997 and 1998 Cole played with some New York musicians under the name the Negatives. The group consisted of Jill Sobule, Dave Derby of the Dambuilders, Mike Kotch and Rafa Maciejak, who recorded an eponymous CD, released mainly in Western Europe and North America. Songs from the album like "Past Imperfect", "Vin Ordinaire" and "No More Love Songs" returned to Lloyd's live sets regularly throughout his career. 

He has since released solo albums on smaller independent labels. Sanctuary Records released Music in a Foreign Language (2003) in the UK. Recorded largely by Cole himself (including tracks recorded directly onto a Mac), the songs had a stark, folk-inspired singer-songwriter style.  The album was released in the U.S. by the One Little Indian label, which also collected a number of outtakes (recorded from 1996 to 2000) on 2002's Etc. and released an instrumental ambient electronica album, Plastic Wood, the same year. Cole has mentioned Music in a Foreign Language as his favourite studio album. It featured new versions of Nick Cave's "People Ain't No Good" and his own "No More Love Songs". Both the title track and "Late Night, Early Town" became staples in his live sets.

In 2004, to mark the 20th anniversary of the release of Rattlesnakes, Lloyd Cole and the Commotions reformed to perform a one-off tour of the UK and Ireland.  The reformation was never intended to be permanent, and Cole released another solo studio album in 2006, Antidepressant, using his usual home recording outfit by playing all the instruments himself with friends like Sobule, Derby and the guitar work of former Commotion Neil Clark on some tracks. The album included "Woman in a Bar" and "The Young Idealists" a.o. Cole has mentioned "Rolodex Incident" as a personal favourite.

2010–2018: Broken Record, Standards and Selective Studies Vol. 1

Broken Record, released in September 2010 preceded by the single "Writer's Retreat", marked a departure from his solo recordings, as it was performed by a band of longstanding friends and working partners, including Fred Maher, Joan As Police Woman, Rainy Orteca, Dave Derby and Blair Cowan – as well as two musicians, Matt Cullen (guitar; banjo) and Mark Schwaber (guitar; mandolin), with whom Cole tours, billed as 'Lloyd Cole Small Ensemble'. The recording of the album was entirely financed by advance purchases by his fans and contributions from Tapete Records, which later distributed the album and also oversaw and negotiated the rights to release a boxed set with his complete collection of B-sides, alternative takes and previously unreleased material, under the title Cleaning Out the Ashtrays.

A further album co-funded by fans, Standards, was released in June 2013, and includes contributions from Fred Maher and Matthew Sweet, Blair Cowan (The Commotions) and Joan Wasser (a.k.a. Joan As Police Woman). It was preceded by the single and video "Period Piece". Other notable songs on the album were Lloyd's re-make of John Hartford's "California Earthquake", "Women's Studies" and favourite "Myrtle and Rose". For the first time since 1999's The Collection, Cole entered the UK album chart with the album.

In February 2013 a new album of electronic music by Cole and Hans-Joachim Roedelius was released, called Selective Studies Vol. 1.

In 2016 Cole went on tour with the Leopards to celebrate the release of the Lloyd Cole and the Commotions Collected Recordings 1983–1988 box set. Live album Lloyd Cole and the Leopards – Live at Brooklyn Bowl was released through his website along with several live recordings of shows he performed with his son William on guitar.

In early 2017 the single Man on the Verge was released as a taster for the Lloyd Cole in New York – Collected Recordings 1988–1996 box set.

2019–present: Guesswork and On Pain
The studio album Guesswork was released on 26 July 2019 by earMUSIC. Recorded (mostly) in his attic studio in Massachusetts, Guesswork was produced by Cole and mixed by German producer Olaf Opal, with executive production from Chris Hughes. The record was mastered by Kai Blankenberg at Skyline Tonfabrik in Düsseldorf. The electronic sounding album also featured contributions from a.o. Fred Maher and former Commotions Blair Cowan and Neil Clark. It was preceded by the singles "Violins" and "Night Sweats". 

In 2021 Cleaning Out the Ashtrays – the 2009 collection of outtakes, alternative versions of his solo work, and cover versions – was released digitally.

On 30 January 2023, Cole announced new studio album On Pain to be released on June 23, 2023. An album featuring eight songs recorded in Cole's attic and produced by Chris Merrick Hughes. Four of the songs are co-written by founding Commotions members Blair Cowan and Neil Clark.

Live performances

In 2010 Cole formed a small ensemble consisting of American musicians Mark Schwaber and Matt Cullen and, in October and November of that year, completed a tour of Europe. Further tours of New Zealand and Australia and Europe followed in 2011. In autumn 2016, Cole undertook a short tour of the UK and Europe, titled 'The Retrospective', playing acoustic versions of songs written between 1983 and 1996.

Personal life
Cole married his American wife, Elizabeth Lewis, in December 1989. They live in Easthampton, Massachusetts.

Legacy
Some of Cole's songs have been covered by other artists. "Rattlesnakes" has been covered by Tori Amos on her concept album Strange Little Girls (2001), while Sandie Shaw has recorded a version of "(Are You) Ready to Be Heartbroken?".

In 2006, Scottish indie pop band Camera Obscura released the song "Lloyd, I'm Ready to Be Heartbroken" as an answer song to Cole's 1984 hit "Are You Ready to Be Heartbroken".

Discography

Lloyd Cole and the Commotions
 Rattlesnakes (1984)
 Easy Pieces (1985)
 Mainstream (1987)

Lloyd Cole and the Negatives
 The Negatives (2000)

Solo
 Lloyd Cole (1990)
 Don't Get Weird on Me Babe (1991)
 Bad Vibes (1993)
 Love Story (1995)
 Plastic Wood (2001)
 Etc. (2001)
 Music in a Foreign Language (2003)
 Antidepressant (2006)
 Broken Record (2010)
 Standards (2013)
 1D Electronics 2012–2014 (2015)
 Guesswork (2019)
 On Pain (2023)

References

External links

Official website

1961 births
Living people
People from Buxton
English male singer-songwriters
British expatriates in the United States
Alumni of University College London
Alumni of the University of Glasgow
Fontana Records artists
Tapete Records artists
Polydor Records artists
Sanctuary Records artists